North Carolina's 12th House district is one of 120 districts in the North Carolina House of Representatives. It has been represented by Republican Chris Humphrey since 2019.

Geography
Since 2023, the district has included all of Greene, Lenoir, and Jones counties. The district overlaps with the 2nd, 4th, and 9th Senate districts.

District officeholders since 1997

Election results

2022

2020

2018

2016

2014

2012

2010

2008

2006

2004

2002

2000

References

North Carolina House districts
Greene County, North Carolina
Lenoir County, North Carolina
Jones County, North Carolina